The York City School District is a large, urban, public school district serving the City of York, Pennsylvania in York County, Pennsylvania. According to 2010 Census data, the District's population was 43,718 people, estimated to be 44,118 as of 2018. As of 2018, the educational attainment levels for the School District of the City of York population were 69.25% high school graduates and 15.38% college graduates.

As of 2018, the median household income in the district is approximately $30,283, while the median family income is approximately $33,048. In the Commonwealth, the median family income was $49,501 and the United States median family income was $49,445, in 2010. According to the Pennsylvania Budget and Policy Center, 81.1% of the District's pupils lived at 185% or below the Federal Poverty level as shown by their eligibility for the federal free or reduced price school meal programs in 2012.

Schools
William Penn Senior High School, 9–12th
McKinley School, K-8th
Edgar Fahs Smith STEAM Academy, 3–12th
Jackson School, K-8th
Phineas Davis School, K-8th
Hannah Penn School, K-8th
A.D. Goode School, K-8th
Ferguson School, K-8th
Devers School, K-8th
William C. Goodridge Academy, 8–12th

High school students may choose to attend York County School of Technology for training in the construction and mechanical trades. Lincoln Intermediate Unit 12 provides the District with a wide variety of services, including specialized education for disabled students and hearing as well as speech and visual disability services and professional development for staff and faculty.

Per the 2012–2013 budget cuts and to deal with a decline in enrollment of 1,000 since 2006, alignment changes were instituted. All elementary schools became grades preschool and K-8. Edgar Fahs Smith Middle School (6–8) and Hannah Penn Middle School were closed. As of 2020, Edgar Fahs Smith Middle School has been reopened as Edgar Fahs Smith STEAM Academy, serving grades 3rd through 12th, and Hannah Penn Middle School has been reopened as Hannah Penn K-8.

Extracurriculars
The district's students have access to a wide variety of clubs, activities and an extensive sports program.

Sports
The district funds:
Varsity

Boys
Basketball – AAAA
Football – AAAA
Indoor Track and Field – AA
Swimming and Diving – AAA
Track and Field – AAA

Girls
Basketball – AAAA
Cheerleading – AAAA
Indoor Track and Field – AAAA
Swimming and Diving – AAA
Track and Field – AAA
Volleyball – AAA

According to PIAA directory June 2015

References

York, Pennsylvania
School districts in York County, Pennsylvania
Susquehanna Valley